This is a list of cricketers who have played first-class, List A or Twenty20 cricket for Kerala cricket team previously known as Travancore-Cochin cricket team.

Seasons given are first and last seasons; the player did not necessarily play in all the intervening seasons. Players in bold have played international cricket.

A
Leslie Aaron, 1958/59
Sandy Aaron, 1957/58
K. N. Ananthapadmanabhan, 1988/89–2004/05
KM Asif, 2018 - present
KC Akshay, 2017 - present
Mohammed Azharuddeen, 2015 - present
Iqbal Abdulla, 2016 - 17
Fabid Ahmed
Athif Bin Ashraf
Mohan Akshaya
Perumparambath Anthaf
Sadanandan Anish
P. M. Anandan
Pallam Anfal
Paliath Ravi Achan 1952-69
Sajeevan Akhil

B
Sachin Baby
C. K. Bhaskaran
Nedumankuzhy Basil
Acharath Babu

C
Akshay Chandran
Krishna Chandran
Sony Cheruvathur
Prasanth Chandran

D
Kunal Datta, 1959/60
Ivan D'Cruz, 1970/71
Sankara Dendapani
Varghese Daniel
Jono Dean
H Devaraj

F
Daryl Ferrario
Fazil Fanoos
Robert Fernandez
Ahmed Farzeen
Faisal Fanoos

G
Suri Gopalakrishna, 1967/68 to 1974-75
Raiphi Gomez
Vathsal Govind
Velayudhan Govindan
A. P. M. Gopalakrishnan
Rojith Ganesh, 2021-present

H
Abhishek Hegde
Vedam Hariharan

J
K Jayaraman, 1977/89
Sijomon Joseph
VA Jagadeesh
Jafar Jamal

K
B. Kalyanasundaram
A. Karunakaran, 1958/59
Ajay Kudua, 1994/2005
Rohan Kunnummal, 2017-present
Arun Karthik
Akshay Kodoth
Vinod Kumar
Shyam Kumar
Krishna Kumar
V Kamaruddin

M
Satish Menon
Madan Mohan
Thomas Mathew
Sudhesan Midhun
Vinoop Manoharan
Karaparambil Monish
Abhishek Mohan
Unnikrishnan Manukrishnan
Renjith Menon
Bala Murali
Acharath Mackey
Prashanth Menon
P. M. K. Mohandas
Sachin Mohan
P Manoj
TS Mahadevan
SP Mullick
TK Madhavan

N
Venkateswarier Neelakantan
MD Nidheesh
Salman Nizar
Sreekumar Nair
Nizar Niyas
Vinan Nair

O
Sunil Oasis

P
Devdutt Padikkal, 2021–present
Rohan Prem
Prasanth Parameswaran
Padmanabhan Prasanth
Balan Pandit
KB Pawan
Arun Poulose

R
P. Ranganathan
S Rajesh, 1981/82 and 1988/89
S Ramesh
Sadagoppan Ramesh, 2005/07
Ponnam Rahul, 2017-present
Feroze V Rasheed
B. Ramprakash
Karimuttathu Rakesh
P. M. K. Raghunath
P. M. Raghavan
Chundangapoyil Rizwan
R. Raghunath
K. Rajagopal
D Ram

S
Somasetty Suresh
Antony Sebastian, 2004-2008
Udiramala Subramaniam, 1970/71-1976/77
Sanju Samson, 2011–present
Ponani Sunder, 1988/89-1995/96
S Santosh, 1983/84 and 1991/92
S Sreesanth
M. Suresh Kumar, 1991/92 - 2004/05
Jalaj Saxena
Sujith Somasunder
Nikhilesh Surendran
Chovvakkaran Shahid
Kanakkatharaparambu Sreejith
Sambasiva Sarma
Sivasubramaniyan Shankar
V. Sreekumar
Padmanabhan Sivadas
Vishweshwar A Suresh, 2021-present
Sharafuddeen, 2021-present

T
Chandra Tejas, 2007/08
Jayamohan Thampi 1979/82
Basil Thampi
Kelappan Thampuran (cricketer, born 1937)
Bhavin Thakkar
Rama Varma Kochaniyan Thampuran
Kochunny Thampuran
Kerala Varma Kelappan Thampuran
Kelappan Thampuran (cricketer, born 1925)

U
Robin Uthappa, 2019–present

V
TS Venkitachalam, 1959/60
Chandroth Vijayan, 1957/58
Vishnu Vinod
Ajay Varma
Amit Verma

W
Sandeep Warrier, 2012-20

Y
Tinu Yohannan, 1999-08

References

Kerala cricketers

cricketers